Nataliya Dmitriyevna Shalagina (born September 1, 1983) is a Russian former swimmer, who specialized in freestyle events. She is a 2003 Russian swimming champion in the 100 m freestyle, and a two-time relay medalist at the Russian Championships (2003 and 2004). Shalagina is a member of PK Yekaterinburg, and is coached and trained by her father Dmitry Shalagin.

Shalagina qualified for two swimming events at the 2004 Summer Olympics by clearing a FINA A-standard entry time of 1:59.98 (200 m freestyle) from the Russian Championships in Moscow. In the 200 m freestyle, Shalagina challenged seven other swimmers on the fifth heat, including top medal favorite Federica Pellegrini of Italy. She edged out Brazil's Mariana Brochado to take a seventh spot and twenty-first overall by 0.54 of a second in 2:02.37.

Shalagina also teamed up with Oxana Verevka, Yelena Bogomazova, and Natalya Sutyagina in the 4×100 m medley relay. Swimming the freestyle leg, Shalagina recorded a time of 57.60, and the Russians finished the second heat in seventh spot and twelfth overall with a final time of 4:10.18.

References

External links
Profile – Info Sport Russia 

1983 births
Living people
Russian female swimmers
Olympic swimmers of Russia
Swimmers at the 2004 Summer Olympics
Russian female freestyle swimmers
Universiade medalists in swimming
Sportspeople from Yekaterinburg
Universiade bronze medalists for Russia
Medalists at the 2003 Summer Universiade